Georgia held its election October 3, 1814.

See also 
 United States House of Representatives elections, 1814 and 1815
 List of United States representatives from Georgia

Notes 

1814
Georgia
United States House of Representatives